Thomas Royal Phillips (born October 23, 1949) is an attorney with the Baker Botts firm in Austin, Texas, who was from 1988 to 2004 the Chief Justice of the Supreme Court of Texas.  With nearly seventeen years of service, Phillips is the third-longest tenured Chief Justice in Texas history.  He was appointed by Governor Bill Clements to fill a vacancy in the office in November 1987, becoming the youngest Chief Justice since Texas became a state. Phillips took office less than a month after CBS' 60 Minutes ran a highly publicized story, entitled "Justice for Sale?," which won widespread attention for its blistering critique of Texas' choice to elect judges by political party without campaign contribution limits. The broadcast alleged improperly close ties between several of the justices and their largest donors, who were amongst the state's most successful personal-injury trial lawyers. In campaigns that received national attention in 1988, Phillips and two other candidates running as Republicans won election to the Court by imposing voluntary limits on the size of campaign contributions. By winning, they joined Railroad Commissioner Kent Hance as the first Republican elected to statewide office since Reconstruction. Phillips, after serving the two years remaining on the term of his predecessor, Chief Justice John L. Hill, was elected to a full term in 1990. In each race he defeated one of his Democratic colleagues on the Court, Ted Z. Robertson in 1988 and Oscar H. Mauzy in 1990, who defended Texas' partisan judicial election system and declined to impose campaign contribution caps. Throughout his tenure, Phillips vigorously advocated a non-partisan appointment-retention election method of choosing Texas judges. While he was ultimately unsuccessful in this effort, like other Texas chief justices before and since, both the Legislature and the Supreme Court imposed restrictions on the amount, timing and source of campaign contributions to judges during his tenure.

Phillips served as President of the Conference of Chief Justices in 1997-98, an Adviser of the Federal Judicial Code Project of the American Law Institute, and a member of the Federal-State Relations Committee of the U.S. Judicial Conference, the Carter-Baker Commission on Federal Election Reform, the Texas Historical Commission, and the NCAA Committee on Infractions. Phillips received the Burton Award for Professionalism in Law in 2004, the National Center for State Courts' Carrico Award for Judicial Innovation in 2005, the American Judicature Society's Justice Award in 2007, the Texas Young Lawyers Association Outstanding Mentor Award in 2010, and Baylor University's "Pro Texana" Meritorious Achievement Award in 2013.

After winning re-election in 1996 and 2002, Phillips retired from the court in 2004 to teach and return to the private sector. Governor Rick Perry appointed Associate Justice Wallace B. Jefferson to succeed Phillips. In private practice, Phillips has primarily been engaged in appellate matters, generally in civil matters, although he was a member of the legal team that convinced the Texas Court of Criminal Appeals to quash the indictment against Governor Perry.

Phillips graduated Woodrow Wilson High School in Dallas, Texas; Baylor University in Waco, Texas; and Harvard Law School in Cambridge, Massachusetts. He holds honorary degrees from Texas Tech University and St. Mary's University.

References

External links
 Biography at Texas Politics

1949 births
Living people
20th-century American judges
20th-century American lawyers
21st-century American judges
Baylor University alumni
Chief Justices of the Texas Supreme Court
Harvard Law School alumni
People from Dallas
People from Austin, Texas
People from Bastrop, Texas
Texas lawyers
Texas Republicans
Texas state court judges
People associated with Baker Botts